William March (February 4, 1937 – October 9, 2022) was an American weightlifter. He competed in the men's middle heavyweight event at the 1964 Summer Olympics.

References

External links
 

1937 births
Living people
American male weightlifters
Olympic weightlifters of the United States
Weightlifters at the 1964 Summer Olympics
Sportspeople from York, Pennsylvania
World Weightlifting Championships medalists
Pan American Games medalists in weightlifting
Pan American Games gold medalists for the United States
Medalists at the 1963 Pan American Games
Weightlifters at the 1963 Pan American Games
20th-century American people